An election was held on November 5, 1929 to elect the President of the New York City Board of Aldermen, in concert with other such contests as the mayoralty, Comptroller, the remainder of the Board of Aldermen, County Sheriffs, Borough presidents, and other miscellaneous questions on the ballot. Democratic incumbent Joseph V. McKee of The Bronx defeated Republican candidate Bird Sim Coler of Brooklyn, himself an independent Democrat, 890,655 votes to 385,514. This combined with Democratic victories in other contests formed what was considered "a Crushing Defeat to [the] City G.O.P. [delivered]" by Tammany Hall.

References

New York City aldermanic presidential election
Aldermanic presidential election
New York City aldermanic presidential election
New York City aldermanic presidential election